Richard Rush (April 15, 1929 – April 8, 2021) was an American film director, scriptwriter, and producer. He is known for directing The Stunt Man, for which he received a nomination for the Academy Award for Best Director. His film Color of Night won a Golden Raspberry Award as the worst film of 1994, but Maxim magazine also singled the film out as having the best sex scene in film history. Rush, whose directing career began in 1960, also directed Freebie and the Bean, a police buddy comedy/drama starring Alan Arkin and James Caan. He co-wrote the screenplay for the 1990 film Air America.

Biography

Early life
Rush spent his childhood fascinated by Marcel Proust and Batman comics. He was one of the first students of UCLA's film program, and, after graduation, Rush worked to create television programs for the United States military showcasing the nation's involvement in the Korean War. While he agreed with the military's involvement in the region, Rush's participation in this largely symbolic conflict can be seen as a defining event for the director who later explained:

After his propaganda work, Rush opened a production company to produce commercials and industrial films.

Early Features
At the age of thirty, inspired by the neo-realism of French director François Truffaut's The 400 Blows, Rush sold his production business to finance his first feature Too Soon to Love (1960), which he produced on a shoestring budget of $50,000 and sold to Universal Pictures for distribution for $250,000. It featured an early film appearance by Jack Nicholson (who starred in two later Rush films, Hells Angels on Wheels and Psych-Out).

Rush wanted to follow it with an adaptation of Whatever Happened to Baby Jane? but did not end up making the film. He was also attached to Kitten with a Whip early on.

Rush then directed Of Love and Desire (1963) with Merle Oberon.

Exploitation Films
Rush's third movie was a spy picture, A Man Called Dagger (1966) which was his first collaboration with cinematographer László Kovács.

Rush directed a car racing film for American International Pictures, Thunder Alley (1967) starring Fabian Forte and Annette Funicello.

He did The Fickle Finger of Fate (1967) for Sidney W. Pink starring Tab Hunter, then did a biker movie for Joe Solomon, Hells Angels on Wheels (1967), starring Nicholson.

Rush was signed by Dick Clark to make two more films for AIP: Psych-Out (1968), a film about the counter culture starring Nicholson and Susan Strasberg, and a biker movie The Savage Seven (1968).

Studio Films
Rush signed a deal with Columbia. His first studio effort was 1970's Getting Straight, starring Elliott Gould and Candice Bergen. The film did well commercially and was deemed by Swedish director Ingmar Bergman to be the "best American film of the decade."

Rush's next movie, in 1974, was Freebie and the Bean. For the most part, Freebie was critically panned; however, it was enormously popular with audiences, grossing over $30 million at the box office.

The Stunt Man
In 1981, Truffaut was asked "Who is your favorite American director?" He answered, "I don’t know his name, but I saw his film last night and it was called The Stunt Man." The film, which took Rush nine years to put together, was a slapstick comedy, a thriller, a romance, an action-adventure, and a commentary on America's dismissal of veterans, as well as a deconstruction of Hollywood cinema. The film also features Rush's typical protagonist, an emotionally traumatized male who has escaped the traditional frameworks of society only to find his new world (biker gangs in Hells Angels on Wheels, hippies in Psych-Out) corrupted by the same influences. The Stunt Man won Rush Oscar nominations for best director and best script (co-nominated with Lawrence B. Marcus).

Later career
When Air America showed signs of trouble during development, Rush was paid full salary to walk away from the project.   This allowed the studio to cast Mel Gibson and Robert Downey, Jr.

Rush did not direct another film for four years, until the 1994's box office failure Color of Night. However, Color of Night also won "Best Sex Scene in film history" award from Maxim magazine; Rush was very proud of the award, and he kept the award in his bathroom.

Afterward, Rush retreated from the world of commercial cinema. As Kenneth Turan of The Los Angeles Times wrote, Rush's career seems to be "followed by the kind of miserable luck that never seems to afflict the untalented."

His last project was a DVD documentary on the making of The Stunt Man entitled The Sinister Saga of Making The Stunt Man (2001).

He resided in Bel Air with his wife Claudia.  He had an older brother, Dr. Stephen Rush who also resided in Los Angeles.

On April 8, 2021, Rush died a week shy of his 92nd birthday at his Los Angeles home after long-term health problems.

Filmography (as director and writer)

References

External links
 
 

1929 births
2021 deaths
Film directors from New York City
University of California, Los Angeles alumni
People from Bel Air, Los Angeles
People from Big Bear Lake, California